Abdel Meguid Mahmoud (born 1946) was the Egyptian Attorney General from 2006 to 5 July 2013. He was removed from office by Mohamed Morsi the President of Egypt on 22 November 2012 after a constitutional declaration made by the president. On 2 July 2013, the Egyptian Court of Cassation deemed his removal illegal and reinstated him again as the general prosecutor of Egypt. On 3 July 2013, President Morsi was deposed in a coup d'état by the military and Mahmoud subsequently resigned on 5 July 2013 shortly after being reinstated to “avoid the embarrassment of making judicial decisions against those who removed me from office.”

References

1946 births
Living people
Attorneys general
Cairo University alumni
20th-century Egyptian lawyers
21st-century Egyptian lawyers